Krestovsky lesouchastok is a rural locality (a selo) under the administrative jurisdiction of the Settlement of Peleduy in Lensky District of the Sakha Republic, Russia, located  from Lensk, the administrative center of the district, and  from Peleduy. Its population as of the 2010 Census was 19, down from 166 recorded in the 2002 Census.

References

Notes

Sources
Official website of the Sakha Republic. Registry of the Administrative-Territorial Divisions of the Sakha Republic. Lensky District. 

Rural localities in Lensky District, Sakha Republic
Populated places on the Lena River